Anomoeotes triangularis is a species of moth of the Anomoeotidae family. It is found in Sierra Leone.

References

Anomoeotidae
Moths of Africa
Moths described in 1907